Berjhab  is a Syrian village located in Ariha Nahiyah in Ariha District, Idlib.  According to the Syria Central Bureau of Statistics (CBS), Berjhab had a population of 619 in the 2004 census.

History 
The region witnessed the Battle of Hab on August 14, 1119.

References

Sources 
 

Populated places in Ariha District
Villages in Idlib Governorate